is a female Japanese singer from Utsunomiya, Tochigi, Japan. She has sung a large number of songs that have been used in a variety of video games, visual novels, and anime.

Itō has sung songs for many visual novels, one song in particular being , the "bad end" ending theme to the visual novel School Days. Itō has also sung songs for a drama CD and anime adaptations of School Days. She has sung songs for the games Kikokugai: The Cyber Slayer, Saya no Uta, Demonbane, Higurashi no Naku Koro ni Matsuri, Chaos;Head, Chaos;Child, Steins;Gate, and  Robotics;Notes, along with the anime series Please Twins!, Myself; Yourself, Hatenkō Yūgi and Occultic;Nine. Her song "DD" on her single "A Wish for the Stars" has her singing in French. In April 2012, she made her American performance debut at Anime Boston. She returned to the United States for an appearance at Sakura-Con in 2015.

Discography

Singles
 "Ethereal Echo", released April 28, 2006
 "Rise on Green Wings" (Kishin Hishō Demonbane opening theme)
 "Angel's Ladder" (Kishin Hishō Demonbane ending theme)
 "Roar" (Kishin Hishō Demonbane theme song)
 "Rise on Green Wings" (instrumental)
 "Escape", released February 22, 2007
 "Escape" (Higurashi no Naku Koro ni Matsuri ending theme)
 "Friend" (Higurashi no Naku Koro ni Matsuri ending theme)
 "Escape" (off vocal)
 "Friend" (off vocal)
 , released October 24, 2007
 "Kimi to Yozora to Sakamichi to" (Myself; Yourself anime ending theme)
 "Ivy" (Myself; Yourself visual novel second opening theme)
 "Kimi to Yozora to Sakamichi to" (off vocal)
 "Ivy" (off vocal)
 "Heartbreaking Romance", released February 20, 2008
 "Heartbreaking Romance" (Hatenkō Yūgi opening theme)
 "Take you as you are" (Hatenkō Yūgi image song)
 "Heartbreaking Romance" (off vocal version)
 "Take you as you are" (off vocal version)
 "Find the blue", released May 7, 2008
 "Find the blue" (Chaos;Head game opening theme)
 "Desire Blue sky" (Chaos;Head game ending theme)
 "Find the blue" (off vocal)
 "Desire Blue sky" (off vocal)
 , released June 26, 2008
 "Tsuisō no Despair" (Higurashi no Naku Koro ni Kizuna: Tatari opening theme)
  (Higurashi no Naku Koro ni Kizuna: Tatari image song)
 "Tsuisō no Despair" (off vocal)
 "Toppū" (off vocal)
 , released July 16, 2008
 "Tsuioku no Kaze" (Togainu no Chi True Blood ending theme)
 "Still Alter ego version" (Togainu no Chi ending theme rearranged)
 "Tsuioku no Kaze" (off vocal)
 "Still Alter ego version" (off vocal)
 "A Wish for the Stars", released August 6, 2008
 "A Wish for the Stars" (Blassreiter second ending theme)
 "DD" (Blassreiter insert song)
 "A Wish for the Stars" (off vocal)
 "DD" (off vocal)
 "F.D.D.", released October 29, 2008
 "F.D.D." (Chaos;Head anime opening theme)
 "Fly to the sky" (Chaos;Head anime image song)
 "F.D.D." (off vocal)
 "Fly to the sky" (off vocal)
 "Fake Me", released February 25, 2009
 "Fake Me" (Chaos;Head Noah Xbox 360 game opening theme)
 "A Will" (Chaos;Head Noah Xbox 360 game ending theme)
 "Fake Me" (off vocal)
 "A Will" (off vocal)
 , released October 28, 2009
 "Skyclad no Kansokusha" (Steins;Gate opening theme)
 "Another Heaven" (Steins;Gate ending theme)
 "Skyclad no Kansokusha" (off vocal)
 "Another Heaven" (off vocal)
 "Fetishism Ark", released June 30, 2010
 "Fetishism Ark" (Chaos;Head Noah PSP game opening theme)
  (Chaos;Head Love Chu Chu! ending theme)
 "Fetishism Ark" (off vocal)
 "Kono Sora no Kanata ni" (off vocal)
 "A. R. / Star-Crossed", released July 28, 2010
 "A. R." (Steins;Gate PC game image song)
 "Star-Crossed" (Starry Sky: in Spring PSP game ending theme)
 "A. R." (off vocal)
 "Star-Crossed" (off vocal)
 "Hacking to The Gate", released April 27, 2011
 "Hacking to The Gate" (Steins;Gate anime opening theme)
 
 "Hacking to The Gate" (off vocal)
 "Reliance" (off vocal)
 "Chaos Logic", released November 28, 2012
 "Chaos Logic" (Chaos;Head Noah PS3 game opening theme)
 "D.P." (Chaos;Head anime Blu-ray box set theme)
 "Chaos Logic" (off vocal)
 "D.P." (off vocal)
 , released April 24, 2013
 "Anata no Eranda Kono Toki wo" (Steins;Gate: Fuka Ryōiki no Déjà vu opening theme)
 "resolution"
 "Anata no Eranda Kono Toki wo" (off vocal)
 "resolution" (off vocal)

Albums 
 , released February 27, 2004
 
 
 
  (Saya no Uta ending theme)
 "Blaze Up" ("Hello, world." ending theme)
 , released May 27, 2005
  (Jingai Makyō ending theme)
 
 
 
 "Ride"
 
  (Jingai Makyō ending theme)
 
 "Still" [Japanese version] (Togainu no Chi ending theme)
 Largo, released October 4, 2006
 "Moonstruck"
 "Heaven"
 "Rise"
 "Lamento" (Lamento: Beyond the Void theme song)
  (Kishin Hishō Demonbane anime ending theme)
 
 
 
  (Gekkō no Carnevale theme song)
 "Voltage"
 
  (Night Wizard! drama CD ending theme)
 Another Best, released December 10, 2008
  (Shinju no Yakata opening theme)
 "La Liberte" (7 online gamers ~offline~ opening theme)
  (Kishin Hishō Demonbane image song)
 "Trigger in My Heart" (Chaosic Rune radio drama second opening theme)
 , (School Days game ending theme)
  (School Days Little Promise drama CD theme song)
 , (School Days anime ending theme)
 "Friend"
  (Kishin Hishō Demonbane DVD image song)
 "Heartbreaking Romance"
  (Shamana Shamana: Tsuki to Kokoro to Taiyō no Mahō opening theme)
  (Shamana Shamana: Tsuki to Kokoro to Taiyō no Mahō ending theme)
 "From This Place" (Please Twins! anime image song)
 "Even Though You Left"
 "Paradise"
 <<<Stargate>>>, released August 26, 2009
 "Open The <<<STARGATE>>>"
 "Liberty"
 "Sunday Sunshine!"
 "Dear my stars"
 
 "technovision" (Steins;Gate insert song)
 
 
 
 
 "déjà vu"
 ChaosAttractor, released January 27, 2010
 
 
 "fake me"
 "Find the blue"
 "escape"
 "A WILL"
 "friend"
 "ivy"
 "F.D.D"
  (Chaos;Head PC game ending theme)
 "Desire Blue sky"
 
 "Another Heaven"
  (hidden bonus track)
 "Fly to the sky" (hidden bonus track)
 Spark, released March 28, 2012
 
 "spark!"
 
 
 
 
 
 
 "Lullaby"
 
 
 Reactor, released May 27, 2015
 "Reactor"
  (Chaos;Child opening theme)
 "Operation Babel"
 "Brave the Sky (Itou Kanako Ver.)"
 "Dive into Elyusion"
 
 
 
 "morning glory"
 "Fantastisk udsigt"
 "BY MY SIDE"
 "Lullaby Blue"

Single songs in compilations
 , ending theme to Kikokugai: The Cyber Slayer (2002)
(2002)
 , ending theme to Zanma Taisei Demonbane (2003)
  ending theme to Saya no Uta (2003)
 , from Please Twins! Image Vocal Album: Esquisse (2003)
 "I Myself Am Hell", ending theme to Phantom: The Animation OVA (2004)
 "Shadow in the dark", theme song to Kishin Hōkō Demonbane PS2 game (2004)
 , opening theme to Jingai Makyō (2005)
 , ending theme to Hanachirasu (2005)
 , ending theme to Dra+KoI (2006)
 "Happy blue sky trip", ending theme to the PC game Sumaga (2008)
 "Miracles May", ending theme to sweet pool (2008)
 , an insert song to the PC game Amber Quartz (2009)
 "Skyclad Observer|Skyclad no kansokusha", opening theme to "Steins;Gate" visual novel (2009)
 "Hacking to the Gate", opening theme to "Steins;Gate" animation series (2011)
 "Maris Stella", ending themes to the Are You Alice? PSP game (2011)
 "Call of the Dungeon", opening theme to Cladun x2, the sequel to the Cladun: This is an RPG PSP game (2011)
 , opening theme to the Labyrinth Tower: Legasista PlayStation 3 game (2012)
 "Immer Sie" and "Tears", ending themes to the PC game Dramatical Murder (2012)
 "Dramatique", a song featured in promotional videos for the PC game Dramatical Murder (2012)
 "Chaos Logic", opening theme of PS3 version of Chaos;Head Noah (2012)
 "Crystalline" and "At Last", ending themes to the PC game Dramatical Murder re:connect (2013)
 "Anata no eranda kono toki wo", opening theme to Steins;Gate: The Movie − Load Region of Déjà Vu (2013)
 "Eien no Owari ni", insert song in Kimi to Kanojo to Kanojo no Koi. (2013)
 "By My Side" and "Lullaby Blue", special ending themes to the Dramatical Murder anime series (2014)
 "Scarlet" and "Voyage Lucid", ending themes to the Dramatical Murder drama CDs, volumes 1 and 2 (2014)
 "Reaching out for our future", opening theme to Etrian Odyssey Untold 2: The Fafnir Knight, a video game in the Etrian Odyssey series (2014)
 "Amadeus", opening theme to Steins;Gate 0, visual novel (2015)
 "Fates Fall", song for Star Guardian event in the game League of Legends (2017)
 "Fátima", opening theme to Steins;Gate 0, anime adaptation (2018)
, theme song for the game Touhou LostWord (2019)
, song for the game Touhou LostWord (2022)

References

External links
 Kanako Itō's personal website 

1973 births
21st-century Japanese singers
21st-century Japanese women singers
Anime singers
Living people
Musicians from Tochigi Prefecture
People from Utsunomiya, Tochigi